The Loi du 20 décembre 1988 relative à la protection des personnes qui se prêtent à des recherches biomédicales, also known as the Loi Huriet or Loi Huriet-Sérusclat, is a French civil law to establish the regulation of those working in biomedical research, and to formalise the status quo of bioethics. It was proposed under the second government of Michel Rocard (Parti socialiste) six months after the 1988 French legislative election. It was the first French law that put clinical trials on a firm legal footing.

First statute 
An appendix, IIb, to the French civil code on Public Health, established the Comité consultatif de protection des personnes dans la recherche biomédicale (CCPPRB), later succeeded by the Comités de protection des personnes (CPP).

Evolution

Notes

References

Bioethics
Health law in France